Harry E. Turner Sr. (December 25, 1927 – July 27, 2004) served in the Ohio House of Representatives.

Turner died in 2004 at the Knox Community Hospital in Mount Vernon, Ohio and was survived by his wife, son, and grandchildren.

References

Members of the Ohio House of Representatives
1927 births
2004 deaths
20th-century American politicians